Department of Highways Futsal Club (Thai สโมสรฟุตซอลกรมทางหลวง ไฮเวย์) is a Thai Futsal club based in Bangkok. The club currently plays in the Thailand Futsal League. The club was founded in 2012 under the control of Thai Mistry of Transport. The club promoted to the top league in 2016 season.

References 

Futsal clubs in Thailand
Futsal clubs established in 2012
2012 establishments in Thailand